The Piano Sonata in C major  613 is a piano sonata written by Franz Schubert. Written in April 1818. The adagio D. 612 is most likely the middle movement according to Martino Tirimo.

Movements
I. Moderato

C major. Fragment (ends after the development with an implied cadence on E major)

(II. Adagio, D. 612)

E major

III.

C major. Fragment (ends at what is presumably the end of the development)

Like a siciliana.

References
 Tirimo, Martino. Schubert: The Complete Piano Sonatas. Vienna: Wiener Urtext Edition, 1997.

External links 
 

Piano sonatas by Franz Schubert
Compositions in C major
1818 compositions